Kaysone Phomvihane Museum is a memorial named after the first leader of the Lao People's Revolutionary Party. It opened on December 13, 1995, and is located in Vientiane.

References

https://www.lonelyplanet.com/laos/vientiane/attractions/kaysone-phomvihane-museum/a/poi-sig/414434/356947

Museums in Laos
Buildings and structures in Vientiane
Tourist attractions in Vientiane